Holospira mesolia, common name widemouth holospira, is a species of air-breathing land snail, a terrestrial pulmonate gastropod mollusk in the family Urocoptidae.

Original description 
Holospira mesolia was originally described by Henry Augustus Pilsbry in 1912. The type locality is Sanderson, Terrell County, Texas, USA.

Pilsbry's original text (the type description) reads as follows:

Distribution 
This species occurs in Texas, USA.

References
This article incorporates public domain text from reference.

Urocoptidae
Gastropods described in 1912